Elma is a genus of air-breathing land snails, terrestrial pulmonate gastropod mollusks in the family Streptaxidae.

Taxonomy
Elma was classified within the subfamily Enneinae. Páll-Gergely et al. (2015) classified Elma according to the first internal anatomy research of the genus either in Streptaxinae or in the Gibbinae.

Distribution 
The distribution of the genus Elma includes Taiwan, northern Vietnam and China.

Species
Species within the genus Elma include:
 Elma fultoni (Bavay & Dautzenberg, 1912)
 Elma mansuyi (Dautzenberg & H. Fischer, 1906)
 Elma matskasii Varga, 2012
 Elma messageri (Bavay & Dautzenberg, 1904) 
 Elma microstoma (Möllendorff, 1881)
 Elma mitis Heude, 1890
 Elma oblongata Yen, 1939
 Elma pachygyra (Gredler, 1885)
 Elma sinensis (Möllendorff, 1886)
 Elma swinhoei (H. Adams, 1866) - type species
 Elma swinhoei hotawana (Pilsbry & Hirase, 1905)
 Elma tonkiniana (Bavay & Dautzenberg, 1904)
Synonyms
 Subgenus Elma (Fultonelma) F. Haas, 1951 : synonym of Pseudelma (Fultonelma) F. Haas, 1951 represented as Pseudelma Kobelt, 1904
 Elma (Fultonelma) bisexigua F. Haas, 1951: synonym of  Pseudelma (Fultonelma) bisexigua (F. Haas, 1951) represented as Pseudelma bisexigua (F. Haas, 1951) (basionym)
 Elma bisexigua F. Haas, 1951: synonym of Pseudelma bisexigua (F. Haas, 1951) (original combination)

References

 Bavay, A. & Dautzenberg, P., 1912. -Description de coquilles nouvelles de l'Indo-Chine. Journal de Conchyliologie 60: 1-54
 Fischer-Piette, E., 1950. Liste des types décrits dans le Journal de Conchyliologie et conservés dans la collection de ce journal (avec planches)(suite). Journal de Conchyliologie 90: 149-180

External links
 Adams H. (1866). Descriptions of fifteen new species of land and freshwater shells from Formosa, collected by Robert Swinhoe, Esq., Consul at Taiwan in that island. Proceedings of the Zoological Society of London. (1866): 316-319 , pl. 33
 Varga A. (2012). On the genus Elma H. Adams, 1866 (Mollusca, Streptaxiidae). Folia Historico Naturalis Musei Matraensis. 36: 5-13

Streptaxidae